Sheiknor Abukar Qassim (born 1961) is an outspoken Somali politician and businessman, and the founder of one of the largest democratic parties in southern Somalia, the Southern Somali Union. In 2000, Sheikhnor founded and became the President/CEO of a Rochester, Minnesota-based company called Primtec.  Sheikhnor also co-founded an influential volunteer-based nonprofit organization called the Somali Institute of Peace Research (SIPR).

External links 
 "Board of Directors". Somali Institute of Peace Research. Retrieved 20 March 2013. 
 "A Petition for an Investigation into International Corruption Case". SomaliTalk. 9 December 2010.
 "49-guurada 1da Luulyo". YouTube.

1961 births
Living people
20th-century Somalian people
21st-century Somalian people
Ethnic Somali people